Remembrance of Earth's Past is a science fiction series by Chinese writer Liu Cixin. The series is also popularly referred to as Three-Body from part of the title of its first novel, The Three-Body Problem. The series details humanity's discovery of and preparation for an alien invasion force from the planet Trisolaris.

Books

Original trilogy
The books in the Remembrance of Earth's Past trilogy are:

 The Three-Body Problem, 2006; English translation by Ken Liu published by Tor Books on November 11, 2014. Also known in Chinese as "三体I"
 The Dark Forest, 2008; English translation by Joel Martinsen published by Tor Books on August 11, 2015. Also known in Chinese as "三体II"
 Death's End, November 2010; English translation by Ken Liu published by Tor Books on September 20, 2016 (September 19 in digital stores). Also known in Chinese as "三体III"

Extended series
 The Redemption of Time, originally posted to an internet forum as fan fiction in 2010 by Li Jun writing as Baoshu, that was later published by Chongqing Press, the original trilogy publisher, with the permission of Cixin Liu in 2011, as Three-Body X: Aeon of Contemplation. It was translated by Ken Liu into English for Tor Books and published on July 16, 2019 as The Redemption of Time.

Science fiction concepts

Sophons 

Sophons are created from eleven-dimensional protons dimensionally unfolded down to two-dimensional protons with Trisolaran particle accelerators. While in the two-dimensional form, they are embedded in circuitry to create a supercomputer. Once online, the embedded supercomputer could control the proton's dimensional level and could fold itself back into an eleven-dimensional proton. To be seen with the naked eye, the protons could unfold themselves down to a fourth-, fifth-, or sixth-dimensional form, becoming larger with each subsequent lower dimension without changing mass. They can visually record anything and thus their secondary purpose is to act as surveillance devices, beaming the information they gather back to another sophon instantaneously via quantum entanglement. Their primary purpose for their Trisolaran manufacturers is to disrupt Earth's particle accelerators, capable of straying into the paths of fired particles and scrambling the results of experiments before re-assembling, effectively blocking advancement of the science. Since they can move through three-dimensional space at the speed of light, a single sophon is capable of disrupting all of Earth's particle accelerators.

Droplets 

Trisolaran space probes are covered in a strong interaction force material. Due to this material, they are stronger than any material in the solar system and thus are impervious to any physical attack. Their propulsion system is capable of moving in any direction in 3D space. Seemingly unaffected by inertia, they can make sudden impossible turns, and their primary method of attack is to simply smash through objects.

Curvature Propulsion 

Simplified in a demonstration as a piece of soap attached to a paper boat on water, with the soap reducing the water tension at its end, and the water tension disparity propelling the boat. Traveling through previous paths slows the boat down due to decreased surface tension. Curvature Propulsion is a method of light speed travel that utilizes the same concept, via reducing the speed of light it is possible to drag a ship through space at light speed, while its wake is a reduced light-speed region of space.

Hibernation 

Humanity by the time of the Dark Forest has developed cryogenic technology, capable of preserving a human life, unaging, for hundreds of years barring certain genetic disorders. Initially, it is viewed as a sign of inequality before it is fully developed, viewed as a way for the rich to simply skip through the centuries to eras of more advanced technology, peace, and human development. With the advent of the Trisolaran invasion, however, it becomes a near-worthless technology in terms of demand, as people prefer to die naturally in a world still free from Trisolaris rather than skip ahead to doomsday. Because of this, only researchers and certain high-value staff make use of cryogenics to skip through time.

Cosmic sociology 

The study of theoretical interactions between cosmic civilizations. This area of study is first proposed by the character Ye Wenjie in conversation with future Wallfacer Luo Ji. Ye Wenjie proposes two axioms of cosmic sociology: "First: Survival is the primary need of civilization. Second: Civilization continuously grows and expands, but the total matter in the universe remains constant." After becoming a Wallfacer, Luo Ji uses the axioms provided by Ye Wenjie to invent the dark forest theory of the universe and the idea of dark forest deterrence to stop the Trisolaran invasion.

Adaptations
The Three-Body Problem is an indefinitely postponed Chinese science fiction 3D film, adapted from The Three-Body Problem, directed by Fanfan Zhang, and starring Feng Shaofeng and Zhang Jingchu.

A Chinese animated series based on the series began releasing on February 27, 2014.

A Chinese animated series based on The Dark Forest started airing on December 10, 2022.

A Chinese live-action series based on The Three-Body Problem aired from January 15 to February 3, 2023.

A series based on The Three-Body Problem has been ordered by Netflix, with David Benioff, D. B. Weiss, and Alexander Woo set to write and executive produce.

A 3-part documentary series entitled Rendezvous with the Future which explores the science behind Liu Cixin’s science fiction was produced by BBC Studios and released by Bilibili in China in November 2022. The series includes an extensive interview with Liu Cixin and covers many ideas featured in the Remembrance of Earth's Past such as: messaging extraterrestrial civilisations, gravitational wave transmitter, dark forest hypothesis; space elevator; artificial hibernation; fusion drive; and circumsolar particle accelerator.

See also
 Hobbesian trap
 Hegemonic stability theory
 Rendezvous with the Future

References

2008 novels
2008 science fiction novels
21st-century Chinese novels
Novels by Liu Cixin
Chinese novels adapted into films
Alien invasions in novels
Hugo Award for Best Novel-winning works
Alpha Centauri in fiction
Novels about the Cultural Revolution
Cryonics in fiction